Psara is a Greek island in the Aegean sea.

Psara may also refer to:
Psara (town), the only village on the Greek island of Psara
Greek ship Psara, the name of several Hellenic Navy vessels
Psara (moth), a genus of moths of the family Crambidae

See also
Psyra (disambiguation)